Van den Eynde, Van Den Eynde, van den Eynde or Vanden Eynde is a surname. Notable people with the surname include:

Alphonse Vanden Eynde (1884 – 1951), Belgian architect
Bastiaan Van den Eynde (born 2000), Belgian basketball player
Catherine van den Eynde (fl. 1605 – 1629), Flemish tapestry weaver
François Vanden Eynde (born 1911), Belgian footballer
Gilles Van den Eynde (fl. 1695), Belgian architect
Guillaume Vanden Eynde (1884 – 1948), Belgian footballer
Hendrik van den Eynde (fl. 1517), Flemish physician and correspondent of Erasmus
Hendrik van den Eynde (1869 – 1939), Dutch sculptor
Huibrecht van den Eynde (1593 – 1662), Flemish sculptor
Jack Van den Eynde (1914 – 1993), Belgian footballer
Jacob van den Eynde (c. 1515 – 1569), Dutch statesman, Grand Pensionary of Holland
Jacobus van den Eynde (died 1729), Flemish organ builder
Jan van den Eynde (late 16th or early 17th century – 1674), Flemish merchant, banker and art collector
Jan van den Eynde II (1620 – 1702), Flemish architect, sculptor and merchant
Jef Van den Eynde (1879 – 1929), Belgian activist
Louis Van den Eynde (1881 – 1966), Belgian painter
Lucas Van den Eynde (born 1959), Belgian film actor
Maarten Vanden Eynde (born 1977), Belgian artist
Niels Van Den Eynde (born 2000), Belgian basketball player
Norbertus van den Eynde (1628 – 1704), Flemish sculptor
Oscar van den Eynde de Rivieren (1864 – 1950), Belgian nobleman and parliamentarian
Petrus van den Eynde (1787 – 1840), Dutch lithographer
Sebastiaen van den Eynde (1625 – 1693), Flemish sculptor
Stan Vanden Eynde (1909 – 1994), Belgian footballer
Willy Van den Eynde (born 1943), Belgian racing cyclist

See also 
Van den Eynde (family), Netherlandish noble family
Wim Van Eynde (born 1960), Belgian cyclist
The Deep Eynde, is a deathrock/punk band from Los Angeles, California